Karl Otto Siedle  (26 June 1889 – 30 May 1918) was a South African first-class cricketer, rugby union player and British Army officer.

The son of Otto Siedle, he was born at Durban in June 1889. He was educated at Weenen County College. He joined his father and brothers, Basil and Jack, in the family business in 1911. Siedle was a keen sportsman, playing both cricket and rugby union. He played first-class cricket for Natal, making a single appearance against the touring Marylebone Cricket Club (MCC) at Pietermaritzburg in December 1913. Batting once in the match, he was dismissed without scoring by Frank Woolley in Natal's first innings. He also bowled nine wicketless overs in the MCC's only innings.

He was a member of the Natal team that participated in the 1911 and 1914 Currie Cup competitions.

Siedle served in the First World War in the British Army with the Royal Field Artillery. By 1917 he held the temporary lieutenant and was made a temporary captain in September of the same year. He was mentioned in dispatches by Douglas Haig in December 1917, at which point he was an acting major. He further appointed in that acting capacity in January 1918. Siedle was killed in action while leading a withdrawal on 30 May 1918, for which he was posthumously awarded the Military Cross for "conspicuous gallantry and devotion to duty while in command of his battery during a withdrawal." His brother, Jack, played Test cricket, while his nephew John Siedle played at first-class level; His sister Perla Siedle Gibson became a well-known singer and a symbol of South Africa during the Second World War. In his will, Siedle left enough money to the Natal Cricket Union to allow them to construct the Karl Siedle Memorial Clock and Tower at Kingsmead, where it remains to this day.

References

External links

1889 births
1918 deaths
People from Durban
South African businesspeople
South African cricketers
KwaZulu-Natal cricketers
Royal Field Artillery officers
British Army personnel of World War I
British military personnel killed in World War I
Recipients of the Military Cross
Sharks (Currie Cup) players